Sur Airport  is an airport serving the Gulf of Oman port of Sur in Oman.

See also
Transport in Oman
List of airports in Oman

References

External links
 OpenStreetMap - Sur
 OurAirports - Sur Airport
 FallingRain - Sur Airport
 

Airports in Oman